Kings Norton railway station serves the Kings Norton and Cotteridge areas of Birmingham, England. It lies on the Cross-City Line from Redditch and Bromsgrove through Birmingham New Street to Lichfield. The station's main entrance is located on Pershore Road South, the A441.

History

The current Kings Norton station is the second station to be built in the Kings Norton area. The original Lifford railway station (the first of three stations to bear the Lifford name) was the first. The station opened in 1849  as part of the Birmingham and Gloucester mainline to Birmingham Camp Hill terminus (later to Curzon Street).

In 1852 the stationmaster, Thomas Clark, was fined 50s for causing a collision. He allowed a goods-train on the line when an express train was due, and used defective signal lamps. The express train collided with the goods train and there was substantial damage, but no loss of life.

On 19 March 1864 at 6:00 pm, a luggage train with several trucks of sheep suffered a failed axle and all of the trucks behind were thrown off the line. Two of the trucks containing sheep descended the embankment and overturned, killing many of the sheep instantly. A fast train from Bristol was halted before it reached the collision site.

Upon the connection of the Birmingham West Suburban Railway (now part the Cross City line) to Birmingham New Street in 1885, this route became preferable to the original mainline (now the Camp Hill line) for Midland express routes. The platforms were extended in length in 1892 with the growth of the BWSR, enabling the construction of a large coal and goods yard with sidings for the adjacent Triplex factory. In the mid 1920s, two additional lines and platforms were added, opening to traffic on 14 March 1926. Stations on the Camp Hill line were closed to Passenger Traffic from January 1941, although passenger trains continue to use the line and stop at Kings Norton Station.

The station was rebuilt in 1978 by British Rail and the lines through the station were electrified in 1993.

Station masters

Thomas Clark. ca. 1852
Charles Reeves ca. 1860
Thomas Plumb 1870—1891 
Levi Lovell 1892—1900(formerly station master at Water Orton)
Aaron Walker 1900—1902(formerly station master at Sandal and Walton, afterwards station master at Nuneaton)
Alfred Smith 1902—1914(formerly station master at Desford)
Frederick James Stallard 1920—1925(formerly station master at Brightside and Wincobank, afterwards station master at Evesham)
A. Edkins 1940—?
Harry Snary 1944–1956(formerly station master at Kings Heath)
W. Chadwick 1956—?(formerly station master at Newcastle-under-Lyme)
Leslie Jones ?—1965

From 1965 the position of station master was abolished.

Today
With the development of both bus and tram services, the need for such a large facility reduced from the 1930s onwards. The result is that today although all four platforms remain in place, only the outer two are in passenger use, with the middle island platforms now derelict.

Refurbished as part of the Cross-City line in 1978, it retained some of its original features following refurbishment, unlike the other 'cross city line' stations. The original station building survived, leased out for commercial purposes, until it was demolished in February 2006 for safety reasons. An extension car park provides a Park and Ride facility.

Kings Norton is served by West Midlands Trains services, using Class 323 electric multiple units. West Midlands Trains operate the Cross-City line on behalf of Transport for West Midlands.

Kings Norton Station is equipped with real-time information departure boards which were installed in 2006 by Central Trains.

Disabled access
There is step-free access to platform 1 (for trains towards ) from the ticket office entrance. Step-free access to platform 4 (for trains towards ) is via the Pershore Road South road bridge and the car park.

Services
There are four trains an hour that serve Kings Norton in each direction on Mondays to Saturdays, on Sunday there are 3 trains an hour, with two terminating northbound Lichfield Trent Valley and southbound at Redditch and one southbound at Bromsgrove and northbound at Birmingham New Street. On weekdays and Saturdays two of the northbound services terminate at Four Oaks whilst two continue onto Lichfield Trent Valley with two southbound services serving Redditch and the other two serving Bromsgrove.

Future

Work on the reopening of the intermediate stations on the Camp Hill line began in autumn 2022, with the stations due to open by the December 2023 timetable change. There will be two services an hour along the line which will give Kings Norton six trains an hour to Birmingham New Street once again, a practice that was paused because of the coronavirus pandemic.

Discussions are currently underway to electrify and re-open platform 2 for Cross City line services which would allow for six trains an hour to serve the Cross City line once again, as there is currently a track path clash between the Cross City and Camp Hill lines which prevents more than four local services an hour crossing the junction just before the station.

In the media
Kings Norton Station has been used, along with many other areas of Birmingham, as a location in the BBC daily serial Doctors (for example in an episode first broadcast on 9 November 2011).

References

External links

Rail Around Birmingham and the West Midlands: Kings Norton railway station
Warwickshire Railways page

Railway stations in Birmingham, West Midlands
DfT Category D stations
Former Midland Railway stations
Railway stations in Great Britain opened in 1849
Railway stations served by West Midlands Trains
1849 establishments in England